Stefano Mammarella (born 2 February 1984) is an Italian futsal player who plays for Acqua e Sapone  as a goalkeeper.

Honours

Club
Montesilvano
 Serie A: 2009–10
 UEFA Futsal Cup: 2010–11

Acqua e Sapone
 Serie A: 2017-2018
 Coppa Italia: 2013–14
 Supercoppa Italiana: 2014

Country
Italy
 UEFA Futsal Championship: 2014; (Bronze): 2012
 FIFA Futsal World Cup (Bronze): 2012

Individual
 UMBRO Futsal Award for Best Goalkeeper: 2011, 2012, 2014
 FIFA Futsal World Cup Best Goalkeeper: 2012
 Pallone Azzurro: 2016

References

External links
UEFA profile

1984 births
Living people
Futsal goalkeepers
Sportspeople from Chieti
Italian men's futsal players